Balengue may refer to:
Lengue people, an African ethnic group who are indigenous to Equatorial Guinea and Gabon
Lengue language, a Bantu language spoken by the Lengue people